The roughhead shiner (Notropis semperasper) is a species of freshwater fish in the family Cyprinidae.
It is found only in the upper James River drainage, Virginia, USA.

In March 2022, the Center for Biological Diversity petitioned the U.S. Fish and Wildlife Service to list the roughhead shiner as endangered.

Sources 

 

Notropis
Taxa named by Carter Rowell Gilbert
Fish described in 1961
Taxonomy articles created by Polbot